Caye Chapel Airport  is an airport serving Caye Chapel, an island  off the coast of Belize. The runway is at the southern tip of the narrow cay.

Airlines and destinations

See also

Transport in Belize
List of airports in Belize

References

External links
OurAirports - Caye Chapel Airport

Aerodromes in Belize - pdf

Airports in Belize
Belize District
Belize Rural South